Lee So-young (January 30, 1990), known by her stage name Esom, is a South Korean actress and model.

Career
She gained recognition for her leading role in the 2014 film Scarlet Innocence, for which she was nominated for Best New Actress in five different award ceremonies. She then had notable roles in television series The Third Charm (2018), Taxi Driver (2021), and film Samjin Company English Class (2020).

In January 2023, Esom signed with new agency Management MMM.

Filmography

Film

Television series

Web series

Television shows

Music video

Awards and nominations

References

External links
 
 
 

South Korean female models
1990 births
Living people
21st-century South Korean actresses
South Korean television actresses
South Korean film actresses
Actresses from Seoul
Models from Seoul